Pelso may refer to:

Lake Pelso (Latin: Lacus Pelso), the modern Lake Balaton 
Pelso Strict Nature Reserve in Finland
Pelso Plate in the Carpathian Basin